Charles Edward Murray (August 16, 1928 – May 29, 2009) was speaker of the Tennessee House of Representatives for two terms, from 1987 to 1991.

A Democrat and a native of Decherd, Tennessee, he was widely regarded as a protégé of Ned Ray McWherter, the previous speaker, who became Tennessee governor in 1987.

A native of Decherd, Tennessee, Murray attended Franklin County public schools, the University of the South, Middle Tennessee State University, and Nashville School of Law. He worked as a lawyer.

He was first elected to the state House in 1970, representing the 39th District, and served from 1971 to 1991. He did not seek re-election in 1990, and was subsequently appointed claims commissioner for Middle Tennessee by McWherter. He retired from that office in 1995.

Murray died May 29, 2009, in The Villages, Florida, where he had made his home since 2004.

References

External links
Tennessee Blue Book

1928 births
2009 deaths
People from Franklin County, Tennessee
Speakers of the Tennessee House of Representatives
Democratic Party members of the Tennessee House of Representatives
20th-century American politicians
People from The Villages, Florida